Karin Lilly Maria Leiditz (later Jansson, later Lörwall, 5 January 1896 – 12 June 1974) was a Swedish diver who competed in the 1920 Summer Olympics. She was born in Hanhals, Halland and died in Lund. In 1920 she was eliminated in the first round of the 10 metre platform competition.

References

1896 births
1974 deaths
Swedish female divers
Olympic divers of Sweden
Divers at the 1920 Summer Olympics
Sportspeople from Halland County